Francky Sembolo (born 9 August 1985) is a Congolese professional footballer who plays as a striker. Between 2005 and 2006 he made seven appearances for the Congo national team, scoring twice. Since 2006 he has been signed to German football clubs only.

Club career
Sembolo started his career with Saint Michel d'Ouenzé and Canon Yaoundé before moving to Germany in 2006. Since then he has played for FC Oberneuland, Holstein Kiel, SV Wilhelmshaven, SSV Jahn Regensburg, Arminia Bielefeld, Hallescher FC, VfL Osnabrück and currently Berliner AK 07.

International career
Sembolo holds German citizenship, but played internationally for Congo, his country of birth. He made his international debut in 2005, and has appeared in FIFA World Cup qualifying matches. During the 2012 Africa Cup of Nations qualification, Sembolo scored twice in a 3–1 win against Swaziland.

References

External links
 

1985 births
Living people
Republic of the Congo footballers
Association football forwards
Republic of the Congo international footballers
Saint Michel d'Ouenzé players
Canon Yaoundé players
FC Oberneuland players
Holstein Kiel players
SV Wilhelmshaven players
SSV Jahn Regensburg players
Arminia Bielefeld players
Hallescher FC players
VfL Osnabrück players
Berliner AK 07 players
SV Meppen players
BSV Schwarz-Weiß Rehden players
FC Teutonia Ottensen players
2. Bundesliga players
3. Liga players
Regionalliga players
Republic of the Congo expatriate footballers
Republic of the Congo expatriate sportspeople in Cameroon
Expatriate footballers in Cameroon
Republic of the Congo expatriate sportspeople in Germany
Expatriate footballers in Germany